= ENSV =

ENSV can stand for:

- Estonian Soviet Socialist Republic, a former Soviet Union constituent republic (Soviet occupation form) (Eesti Nõukogude Sotsialistlik Vabariik in Estonian)
- Higher National Veterinary School, École nationale supérieure vétérinaire in French
